Herbert Ernst Groh (27 May 190528 July 1982) was a Swiss tenor.

Groh was born in Lucerne and subsequently studied in Zurich and Milan. One of his teachers was Carl Beines, who also taught Richard Tauber.

He began his operatic singing career in Darmstadt in 1926, with engagements following in Frankfurt and Cologne and a successful tour of Italy in 1927, where he also began to make his first recordings using the name of Ernesto Groh. He then started to appear on German radio and devoted himself to developing a career as a recording artist - also making films, but soon giving up the stage - a career that lasted well into the LP era of the 1950s.

He died in 1982 at Norderstedt, near Hamburg.

Critical appreciation
Like Marcel Wittrisch, Groh is inevitably compared to his contemporary Richard Tauber. According to Alan Blyth:  "Groh . . . is fonder yet than Tauber of unwritten touches of quite exceptional delicacy, and surpasses his older coeval in sheer technical control."

Recordings
A selection of Groh's recordings were released  in 1990 by Pavilion Records on Pearl (GEMM CD 9419).

Films

References
Blyth, Alan (1990), 'Herbert Ernst Groh' (liner notes) for Pavilion Records Limited

1905 births
1982 deaths
People from Lucerne
Swiss operatic tenors
20th-century Swiss male opera singers